Studie II is an electronic music composition by Karlheinz Stockhausen from the year 1954 and, together with his Studie I, comprises his work number ("opus") 3. It is serially organized on all musical levels and was the first published score of electronic music.

History
The composition was provisionally titled Bewegungen (Motions), but the name was later changed to Studie II. It was commissioned by what was then the NWDR, in whose Studio für elektronische Musik in Cologne the piece was created. The world premiere took place in Cologne on 19 October 1954 in the concert series Musik der Zeit, together with Stockhausen's Studie I and works by Henri Pousseur, Karel Goeyvaerts, Herbert Eimert, and Paul Gredinger.

In contradistinction to musique concrète, Stockhausen wanted no longer "to use any electronic acoustic sources, with the sound spectra already built up (Melochord, Trautonium), but only produced from the pure tones of a frequency generator ("pure" notes without overtones)" therefore using neither electroacoustic instruments nor other found sounds. The ideal was to produce each sound synthetically and thus separately determined in its details: "The conscious organization of music extends to the micro-acoustic sphere of the sound material itself".

He had previously tried out sound synthesis with pure tones in Studie I. However, an aesthetic problem arose: "Instead of a fusion of the pure tones into new, more complex sounds, the individual pure tone components appeared separately audible and are easily identifiable. Thus, the impression develops of chords formed from pure tones instead of a new sound quality. On the other hand, the individual pure tones receive their own sound quality owing to their easy identifiability, about comparable to the specific sound of a simple music instrument somewhere between a flute and special pipe-organ registers".

Materials and form

Stockhausen's two Elektronische Studien are amongst the earliest examples of composition with what he called "groups", in contrast to the earlier concept of punctualism or "point composition", in works like Kreuzspiel.

The idea at the core of Studie II was the decision to extrapolate everything from the number 5. Five main sections are each divided into five subsections, and each subsection contains five groups consisting of one to five sounds, called "tone mixtures". Each of these tone mixtures is constructed as five equally spaced, reverberated sine tones. The width of the tone mixtures remains constant within each group, but changes from group to group in five widths derived from an underlying scale. For the pitches, Stockhausen built a scale in which the interval between successive steps consists of the frequency proportion —in other words, the interval of 5:1 (two octaves plus a just major third) is divided into 25 equal parts. This differs from the traditional tempered tuning system, in which an octave consists of twelve segments, the interval between two adjacent steps being therefore defined by the ratio . The intervallic unit is a "large semitone", about 10% larger than the semitone of the equal-tempered twelve-tone system. Beginning at 100 Hz, this scale reaches to ca. 17,200 Hz, with a total of 81 equally spaced pitches. Because of the chosen basic interval, no octave duplications can occur. The highest pitch, 17,200 Hz, is near the upper limit of human hearing, and occurs only in a single tone mixture, as the uppermost of its five pitches.

The five sections of the piece are differentiated in the first instance by the types of groups employed: horizontal (melodic) or vertical (chordal). Horizontal groups are either connected (legato) or separated by silences; vertical groups either attack all notes together and end with one note after another, or build up gradually into a chord and then end together. The pattern is as follows:
 horizontal, with linked sounds;
 vertical, with groups alternately beginning and ending simultaneously;
 horizontal, with silences between the sounds;
 vertical, as in section 2;
 combination of horizontal and vertical.

Reception

Studie II was part of the very first "concert presentation of compositions developed in the Cologne studios of NWDR" (from the programme of the premiere of the piece from 19 October 1954). On this evening the public heard for the first time a purely electronic piece based on sine tones. The effect of the sounds and noises was accordingly unforeseeable and new, and the associated composition methods on the public.

In the course of time Studie II became a milestone not only in Stockhausen's early work, but in the history of the electronic music generally. In his Gesang der Jünglinge, he used recorded and transformed vocal sounds in addition to electronic sounds; later he built on Gottfried Michael Koenig's procedure of "transforming unification of the originally diverse", as he also incorporated sounds performed live (in the orchestral composition Mixtur as well as in the instrumental and/or vocal pieces of ensemble of Mikrophonie I and Mikrophonie II) or ring modulated recordings of traditionally produced music (in the tape composition Telemusik).

References

Cited sources

Further reading
 Adorno, Theodor W. 1991. "Das Altern der Neuen Musik" (radio lecture, Süddeutscher Rundfunk, April 1954). First published 1956 in his Dissonanzen: Musik in der verwalteten Welt, 7th edition, 136–159. Göttingen: Vanderhoeck & Ruprecht. Also in his Gesammelte Schriften 14, Frankfurt am Main: Suhrkamp, 1973.
 Adorno, Theodor W. 2002. Essays on Music, selected, with introduction, commentary, and notes by Richard Leppert; new translations by Susan H. Gillespie. Berkeley, Los Angeles, London: University of California Press.  (cloth)  (pbk).
 Assis, Gustavo Oliveira Alfaix. 2011. Em busca do som: A música de Karlheinz Stockhausen nos anos 1950. São Paulo: Editora UNESP. .
 Burow, Winfried. 1973. Stockhausens Studie II. Schriftenreihe zur Musikpädagogik 7. Frankfurt (am Main): Diesterweg.
 Decroupet, Pascal, and Elena Ungeheuer. 1994. "Karel Goeyvaerts und die serielle Tonbandmusik". Revue Belge de Musicologie 48:95–118.
 Heikinheimo, Seppo. 1972. The Electronic Music of Karlheinz Stockhausen: Studies on the Esthetical and Formal Problems of Its First Phase, translated by Brad Absetz. Acta Musicologica Fennica 6 (ISSN 0587-2448). Helsinki Suomen Musiikkitieteelinen Seura / Musikvetenskapliga Sällskapet.
 Hilberg, Frank, and Harry Vogt (eds.). 2002. Musik der Zeit, 1951–2001: 50 Jahre Neue Musik im WDR: Essays, Erinnerungen, Dokumentation. Cologne: Wolke Verlag. .
 Kelsall, John. 1975. "Compositional Techniques in the Music of Stockhausen (1951–1970)". PhD diss. Glasgow: University of Glasgow.
 Ligabue, Marco, and Francesco Giomi. 1998. "Understanding Electroacoustic Music: Analysis of Narrative Strategies in Six Early Compositions". Organised Sound: An International Journal of Music Technology 3, no. 1 (April): 45–49.
 Silberhorn, Heinz. 1978. Die Reihentechnik in Stockhausens Studie II. Herrenberg: Musikverlag Döring. Reprinted, [Rohrdorf]: Rohrdorfer Musikverlag, 1980. .
 Stockhausen, Karlheinz. 1992. "Etude (1952): Musique Concrète", in the text booklet for Stockhausen Complete Edition CD 3, 5–7 (German); 95–100 (English).
 Straebel, Volker. 2008. "Das Altern der Elektroakustischen Musik: Anmerkungen aus archivarischer Sicht", Forum Musikbibliothek: Beiträge und Informationen aus der musikbibliothekarischen Praxis 29, no. 4:327–334.
 . 1996. "Nur ein Gast in der Tafelrunde. Theodor W. Adorno: kritisch und kritisiert". In Von Kranichstein zur Gegenwart. 50 Jahre Darmstädter Ferienkurse, edited by Rudolf Stephan, 149–155. Stuttgart: Daco. .
 Ungeheuer, Elena. 1992. Wie die elektronische Musik 'erfunden' wurde...: Quellenstudie zu Werner Meyer-Epplers Entwurf zwischen 1949 und 1953. Kölner Schriften zur Neuen Musik 2, edited by Johannes Fritsch and Dietrich Kämper. Includes CD recording. Mainz: B. Schott's Söhne. .
 Williams, Sean. 2016. "Interpretation and Performance Practice in Realizing Stockhausen's Studie II". Journal of the Royal Musical Association 141, no. 2:445–481.

External links
 MedienKunstNetz 

Compositions by Karlheinz Stockhausen
Electronic compositions
Serial compositions
1954 compositions